Henry Charles DeAhna (born ca. 1823/1826, died 1891) was a collector of customs for the United States Department of the Treasury, and from August 14, 1877, to March 26, 1878, was the highest-ranking federal official in the Department of Alaska, making him the de facto governor of the territory.

Notes

1820s births
1891 deaths
Commanders of the Department of Alaska